Little Mandeville Island is a small, mostly submerged island in the San Joaquin River delta, in California. In 1994,  of former farmland was inundated with water after a levee broke.

References

Islands of San Joaquin County, California
Islands of the Sacramento–San Joaquin River Delta
Islands of Northern California